Jadab Sawargiary is an Indian politician from Indian National Congress. He was elected in Assam Legislative Assembly election in 2021 from Dudhnai constituency.

References 

Living people
Indian National Congress politicians from Assam
Assam MLAs 2021–2026
Year of birth missing (living people)
People from Goalpara district